Pyrrolysine, or Pyl, is a naturally occurring, genetically coded amino acid.

Pyl or PYL may also refer to:
 Jean Vander Pyl (1919–1999), US actress
 Pyl Brook, London, England
 PYL Younique Volume 1, a Korean album
 Fatherland and Liberty Nationalist Front (Spanish: Patria y Libertad), Chile